Zsuzsa Mary also known as Zsuzsi Mary (Born Zsuzsanna Mary; 13 October 1947 – 24 December 2011) was a Hungarian pop singer.

Career
She appeared first time on stage in 1965, later she finished on the first place in the Hungarian Television's song contest, the  Táncdalfesztivál, with the song "Mama" (Mom) in 1968. The songwriter was Attila Dobos, who would be her first husband. She was successful in the Eastern Bloc countries too. In 1969, she married György Klapka, and soon after emigrated with her husband. They divorced in 1987, but maintained a good relationship. She returned to Hungary after the end of Communism. Mary came out as bisexual in 2008.

Death
She committed suicide on Christmas Eve, 2011, aged 64. According to Magyar Távirati Iroda (MTI), her body was found the next day, 25 December 2011. Her suicide was confirmed by her second husband, György Klapka.

Albums
 1991 – Ez az utolsó tangó  (This is the last tango)
 2002 – Premier M  (My premier)
 2005 – Sodor a szél   (Drifting in the wind)

Posthumous releases
26 December, 2011 – Elszálltaka az évek (CD Single) (Vanished over the years)

It's as if this song would have been written to say goodbye.
The refrain:

"Flew off over the yearsThey do not hurt the silenceThe tranquility locking armsSo rock out''"

See also
Hungarian pop

References

Sources
 Mary Zsuzsi profile at allmusic.hu-n (in Hungarian)
 
 

1947 births
2011 deaths
2011 suicides
Bisexual singers
Bisexual women
20th-century Hungarian women singers
Hungarian pop singers
Hungarian defectors
Hungarian LGBT singers
Hungarian bisexual people
Drug-related suicides in Hungary
20th-century Hungarian LGBT people
21st-century Hungarian LGBT people
Suicides in Hungary